Louis A. Kaiser (1870 – August 12, 1939) was a Captain in the United States Navy, as well as briefly in charge of the government on Guam. He was a pioneer in the Navy on the use of wireless telegraphy, prior to World War I.

Early career
Kaiser was born in Kirkwood, Illinois. He graduated from the United States Naval Academy in 1889 and was commissioned an Ensign in 1891. His first assignment was USS Chicago. In 1894, he was transferred to USS Detroit, and again to USS Michigan, two years later. In 1896, he was reassigned to USS Concord.

In the Spanish–American War, he continued to serve on Concord, and he fought in the Battle of Manila Bay. In December 1898, he was promoted to Lieutenant, junior grade. In 1899, he was briefly made in charge of the government of Guam, in preparation for the arrival of Governor Richard Phillips Leary.

Bureau of Equipment
In 1904, he was transferred again to the Bureau of Equipment. In this role, Kaiser was a pioneer in early wireless transmissions and conducted many of the early tests of wireless telegraphy. In 1905, he demonstrated an 1,100+ mile range while testing it aboard the USS Brooklyn. In July 1905, he was promoted to a full lieutenant commander and invited to speak on these innovations to the Washington Society of Engineers in Washington, DC. In 1910, he was transferred to the Bureau of Steam Engineering.

In 1912, he was given his first command, the cruiser USS Montgomery. The following year, he was given command of the USS Tennessee before being promoted to a full commander. He served in the Boston Naval Yard and Naval War College in Newport, Rhode Island in 1915, before returning to the command of the battleship USS New Jersey and receiving a promotion to captain.

Later career
In the 1920s, Kaiser was assigned to the hydrographic office in Galveston, Texas. In 1923, he was briefly the acting-commandant of the 8th Naval District before being assigned to the New York hydrographic office. He retired April 1, 1925.

He died on August 12, 1939, and is buried in Arlington National Cemetery.

References
"Late Naval Orders." The Washington Post. Washington, D.C.: Aug 14, 1891. pg. 8, 1 pgs
"THE UNITED SERVICE." New York Times. New York, N.Y.: Aug 21, 1894. pg. 8, 1 pgs
"THE UNITED SERVICE." New York Times. New York, N.Y.: Nov 21, 1896. pg. 6, 1 pgs
"President Makes Nominations." The Atlanta Constitution. Atlanta, Ga.: Mar 30, 1898. pg. 3, 1 pgs
"Admiral Bunce Retires To-morrow." New York Times. New York, N.Y.: Dec 24, 1898. pg. 2, 1 pgs
"Progress of the Governor of Guam." New York Times. New York, N.Y.: Aug 2, 1899. pg. 4, 1 pgs
"Lieut. Gillmore on His Way Home." The Washington Post. Washington, D.C.: Feb 28, 1900. pg. 3, 1 pgs
"ORDERS TO ARMY OFFICERS." The Washington Post. Washington, D.C.: Nov 12, 1904. pg. 10, 1 pgs
"WIRELESS 1,100 MILES AT SEA." New York Times. New York, N.Y.: Jul 28, 1905. pg. 1, 1 pgs
"Orders to Naval Officers." The Washington Post. Washington, D.C.: Sep 20, 1905. pg. 4, 1 pgs
"To Explain Wireless Telegraphy." The Washington Post. Washington, D.C.: Mar 17, 1906. pg. F3, 1 pgs
"THE UNITED SERVICE." New York Times. New York, N.Y.: Apr 12, 1912. pg. 21, 1 pgs
"THE UNITED SERVICE." New York Times. New York, N.Y.: Jul 4, 1915. pg. S6, 1 pgs
"UNITED STATES NAVY." The Washington Post. Washington, D.C.: Dec 16, 1923. pg. 42, 1 pgs
"Capt. L.A. Kaiser Rites Here Today." The Washington Post. Washington, D.C.: Aug 15, 1939. pg. 26, 1 pgs

1870 births
1939 deaths
Governors of Guam
People from Warren County, Illinois
United States Navy officers
United States Naval Academy alumni
American military personnel of the Spanish–American War
Burials at Arlington National Cemetery
American electrical engineers
Engineers from Illinois
Military personnel from Illinois